Kirk Barton (born November 4, 1984) is a former player, and former graduate assistant for the Ohio State Buckeyes football team.

He was drafted by the Chicago Bears in the seventh round of the 2008 NFL Draft of the National Football League. He played college football at Ohio State.

1984 births
Living people
Ohio State Buckeyes football players
People from Naples, Florida
Chicago Bears players
American football offensive linemen